Milk Music is an American rock band from Olympia, Washington. The band consists of Alex Coxen (vocals, guitar) Joe Rutter (drums), Charles Waring (guitar), and Dave Harris (bass).

History
The band's first release was a self-titled demo tape, of which only 300 copies were made. The cassette was released independently in 2009. These were followed by 2010's Beyond Living EP, which was released independently and in part through Perennial Records; 2011's Violence Now split-single, released on flexi-disc by Perennial, featuring "White Light" by Carrie Keith (of Gun Outfit) as the b-side; and the Almost Live cassette tape, featuring a performance on Brian Turner's WFMU radio show, released independently in 2012. The band's first full-length LP, Cruise Your Illusion, was released on April 2, 2013. Four years later, on March 15, 2017, the long-awaited second full-length LP, Mystic 100's, was officially released on Dom America.

In the spring of 2013, the band toured South America with Merchandise and Destruction Unit. The band also performed in Pitchfork Music Festival and Primavera Sound festival in 2012.

Musical style
The band's music is often compared to Hüsker Dü, Meat Puppets, and The Wipers, all of which they are influenced by. The band's other influences include Black Flag, Neil Young, Sonic Youth, The Velvet Underground, The Rolling Stones, The Gun Club, Creedence Clearwater Revival, Townes Van Zandt and Jimi Hendrix. The band's music is characterized by its fuzzy and melodic guitars, and lo-fi aesthetics, which can be likened to late-60's acid rock, 70's punk and hard rock, and 80's SST Records releases. The band has also occasionally been labeled as "grunge", a label which the frontman Alex Coxen adamantly dismisses.

Discography
Studio albums
 Cruise Your Illusion (2013, Fat Possum Records)
 Mystic 100's (2017, Dom America)
 On a Micro Diet (2023, Listening House)
 
EPs and singles
 Beyond Living (2010, released independently)
 NUTS! #6, split album with Carrie Keith (2010, Perennial Records)

Demos 
 Milk Music demo tape (2009, released independently)

Live albums
 Almost Live (2012, released independently)
 Live - April Fools Day | Tempe, AZ (2013, Ascetic House)

References

Alternative rock groups from Washington (state)
Fat Possum Records artists
Indie rock musical groups from Washington (state)
Punk rock groups from Washington (state)
Musical quartets
Musical groups established in 2009
Musical groups from Olympia, Washington